"Planica, Planica" is a 1979 Slovenian polka song performed by Ansambel bratov Avsenik (Slavko Avsenik Und Seine Original Oberkrainer). This song was Slavko Avsenik's tribute to Planica.

Background
Music was written by Slavko Avsenik, lyrics written by Marjan Stare and arranged by Slavko's brother Vilko Ovsenik. Original voice was contributed by three vocals in the band at that time: Ema Prodnik, Jožica Svete and Alfi Nipič. Song world premiered at opening of 5th FIS Ski Flying World Championships on 15 March 1979 when band performed in the rain on the stage under RTV dom next to famous flying hill Letalnica bratov Gorišek. The main chorus »Planica, Planica, snežena kraljica« (Planica, Planica, snow queen) is played every time someone jumps further than 230 meters. In 1979 it was first time released on »Frochloche stunden mit music« in Germany. A year later song was first released in Slovenia on »Vesele urice«.

Tribute to Planica
From 1946-1952 Slavko Avsenik was a national team ski jumper. But then he injured and became a musician. In 1948 he set his personal record of 74 m (243 ft) in Planica at Srednja Bloudkova (K80). Slavko was always big fan of ski jumping and especially of Planica to whom he was very emotionally attached. That's why he decided to write this song as a tribute to Planica. He was even funding renovations of Planica in the past.

Personnel
Slavko Avsenik - music, accordion 
Marjan Stare - lyrics
Vilko Ovsenik - arrangement
Lev Ponikvar - guitar
Franc Košir - trumpet
Mik Soss - baritone horn
Albin Rudan - clarinet 
Alfi Nipič - vocal
Ema Prodnik - vocal
Jožica Svete - vocal

Lyrics
The following provides the original Slovene text of »Planica, Planica« by Marjan Stare and its literal translation in English.

References

1979 singles
Slovenian songs
1979 songs